Rupanco Lake is located in Los Lagos Region of Chile. The closest city, Osorno, has a primary school named after it as well.

External links
Pictures of Rupanco Lake
About Rupanco Lake

Rupanco
Lakes of Los Lagos Region